Daphna Hacker (born 16 April 1969) is a full professor at the Tel Aviv University Law Faculty and Women and Gender Studies Program. After publishing Legalized Families in the Era of Bordered Globalization, Hacker was awarded the 2018 LSA Jacob Book prize.

Early life and education
After attending Rene Cassin Alliance High School and serving in the IDF, Hacker earned her LL.B in 1994 from the Hebrew University of Jerusalem. She then moved to North America where she graduated with an LL.M. at the Washington College of Law in 1996 (sum com laude).

Career
From 1993 to 1994, Hacker was a research assistant for Michael Atlan at the Hebrew University of Jerusalem Law Faculty. From there, she worked as a law clerk at Veisglass-Almagor Law Firm and was later admitted to the Israel Bar Association. By 2000, Hacker was teaching at Tel Aviv University. Originally a teacher in their Sociology and Anthropology department, she was promoted to assistant professor at the Law Faculty and the Women and Gender Studies Program by 2005. In 2007, she began advocating for legislation ratifying Israeli law that treats single or married women differently. She described that she has received bodily threats from men's rights organizations for her advocacy, including the slashing of her tires, threatening phone calls, and calls to her employer.

After receiving a grant from the New Israel Fund, Hacker joined the Israeli Women's Network (IWN) and served for a decade as a Board Member of the Itach-Maaki Women Lawyers for Social Justice organization. In 2010, she received a nomination to the Young Scholars in Humanities and Social Science Forum of the Israeli Academy of Science.

In 2011, Hacker resigned from the Governmental Committee on Parental Responsibility upon Divorce. The following year, she published Family Issues from a Legal Perspective through the Modan Publishing House and the Ministry of Defense. In 2013, she was awarded the Katan Award for the Advancement of Gender Justice through Voluntary Work. For her work on women in Israel, she was the inaugural winner of the "Small Signal award," named after Yossi Klein, whom the non-profit Female Spirit Association gives to women who volunteer for gender justice.

Beginning in 2014, she became the chief editor of Tel-Aviv University Law Review.

In 2018, she was appointed head of the gender program at Tel Aviv University. As well, her book Legalized Families in the Era of Bordered Globalization, published by the Cambridge University Press, won the 2018 LSA Herbert Jacob Book Prize.

References 

Living people
1969 births
Israeli feminists
People from Jerusalem
Moscow State University alumni
Washington College of Law alumni
Academic staff of Tel Aviv University
Academic journal editors
Hebrew University of Jerusalem Faculty of Law alumni
Israeli women academics
21st-century Israeli women writers
Israeli expatriates in the United States